The Sportingbet.com World Series of Snooker was played for the second season and final time in the 2009/2010 season. The World Series of Snooker were a series of invitational events. It was sponsored by sportingbet.com, but after the second event no others were held.

The winner of each tournament received five points, the runner-up three and losing semi-finalists one each. These points would have determined seeding positions for the Grand Finals.

World Series of Snooker – Killarney

The first event of the World Series of Snooker 2009/2010 was held at the INEC, Killarney, Ireland between 16 and 17 May 2009.

Shaun Murphy won in the final 5–1 against Jimmy White.

Players

Professionals:
  Shaun Murphy
  Ken Doherty
  John Higgins
  Jimmy White

Wildcards:
  Greg Casey
  Tony Moore 
  Andrew Gray 
  Jason Devaney

Main draw

Century breaks
 131, 129  Shaun Murphy
 118  Ken Doherty
 100  Jimmy White

World Series of Snooker – Prague

The second and final event of the World Series of Snooker 2009/2010 was held at the Aréna Sparta Podvinný Mlýn, Prague, Czech Republic between 17 and 18 October 2009.

Jimmy White won in the final 5–3 against Graeme Dott

Players
                 Professionals:
  Stephen Maguire
  Graeme Dott
  John Higgins
  Jimmy White

 Wildcards:
  Krystof Michal
  Osip Zusmanovic
  Lukas Krenek
  Sishuo Wang

Main draw

Century breaks 
 103  Jimmy White
 100  Graeme Dott

Points table

References

2009
World Series 2010
2009 in Irish sport
2009 in Czech sport
Sport in Killarney
Sports competitions in Prague
Snooker competitions in Ireland
Snooker in the Czech Republic
October 2009 sports events in Europe
May 2009 sports events in Europe
2000s in Prague